Reginald Innes Pocock F.R.S. (4 March 1863 – 9 August 1947) was a British zoologist.

Pocock was born in Clifton, Bristol, the fourth son of Rev. Nicholas Pocock and Edith Prichard. He began showing interest in natural history at St. Edward's School, Oxford. He received tutoring in zoology from Sir Edward Poulton, and was allowed to explore comparative anatomy at the Oxford Museum. He studied biology and geology at University College, Bristol, under Conwy Lloyd Morgan and William Johnson Sollas. In 1885, he became an assistant at the Natural History Museum, and worked in the section of entomology for a year. He was put in charge of the collections of Arachnida and Myriapoda. He was also given the task to arrange the British birds collections, in the course of which he developed a lasting interest in ornithology. The 200 papers he published in his 18 years at the museum soon brought him recognition as an authority on Arachnida and Myriapoda; he described between 300 and 400 species of millipedes alone, and also described the scorpion genus Brachistosternus. In 1929, he proposed the family Nandiniidae, with the genus Nandinia as its sole member. He argued that it differs from the Aeluroidea by the structure and shape of its ear canal and mastoid part of the temporal bone.

In 1904, he left to become superintendent of the London Zoo, remaining so until his retirement in 1923. He then worked, as a voluntary researcher, in the British Museum, in the mammals department.
  
He described the leopon in a 1912 letter to The Field, based on examination of a skin sent to him by W. S. Millard, the secretary of the Bombay Natural History Society.

His brother Edward Innes Pocock played international rugby for Scotland and was part of Cecil Rhodes' Pioneer Column. His great grandfather was marine artist Captain Nicholas Pocock.

Selected works

References

External links
 
 Works by Reginald Innes Pocock, at the Biodiversity Heritage Library

1863 births
1947 deaths
Scientists from Bristol
British zoologists
Fellows of the Royal Society
British arachnologists
Zoo directors
People educated at St Edward's School, Oxford
Myriapodologists
Members of the Bombay Natural History Society